National Highway 306A, commonly called NH 306A is a national highway in  India. It is a spur road of National Highway 306. NH-306A traverses the state of Mizoram in India.

Route 
Vairengte, Saiphai, Zonmun, New Vertek.

Junctions  
 
  Terminal near Vairengte.
  Terminal near New Vertek.

See also 
 List of National Highways in India
 List of National Highways in India by state

References

External links 
NH 306A on OpenStreetMap

National highways in India
National Highways in Mizoram